Nistha Chakraborty, also spelt as Nishtha Chakraborty, is an Indian kick boxer from Tripura.

Personal life 
She was born into a Bengali family in Tripura, northeastern state of India. Her father is Hiralal Chakraborty. She is a student of humanities at Holy Cross College.

Career 
She is coached by Pinaki Chakraborty.

She won a gold medal in the WAKO Diamond World Cup 2018 in Russia.

She won a gold medal and two silvers in the  ninth world kick-boxing championship in the Russian city of Anapa.

She won a bronze medal in the  4th Asian Pencak Silat championship.

Honour 
She was appointed ambassador of women's empowerment by the Government of Tripura in 2018.

References

External links 

 Nistha Chakraborty on Twitter

Indian athletes
Sportswomen from Tripura
Kickboxers
Indian kickboxers